Vendée Fontenay Foot is a French football club based in Fontenay-le-Comte, Vendée. It was founded in 1991 in a merger of two teams, the Stade Athlétique Fontenaysien and Étoile. The club currently plays in the Championnat National 3, the fifth tier of the French football league system.

History
The club was formed in 1991 from the merger of the Stade Athlétique Fontenaysien and Étoile.

The club played mostly in CFA before being demoted to CFA 2 in 2005 for non-sporting reasons.

At the end of the 2006–07 season the club finished first in its group in CFA 2, allowing it to return in CFA.

Fontenay reached the 1/8-finals of the 2000–01 Coupe de France, losing on penalties to Lyon.

Current squad

References

External links
Vendée Fontenay Foot Official Website

Association football clubs established in 1991
1991 establishments in France
Sport in Vendée
Football clubs in Pays de la Loire